{{Speciesbox
| image = 
| status = LC
| status_system = IUCN3.1
| status_ref = <ref name="iucn status 11 November 2021">{{cite iucn |authors=Caicedo, J., Calderón, M., Ines Hladki, A., Ramírez Pinilla, M., Renjifo, J. & Urbina, N. |date=2015 |title=Stenocercus trachycephalus' |volume=2015 |page=e.T44579948A115389542 |url=https://www.iucnredlist.org/species/44579948/115389542 |access-date=16 December 2021}}</ref> 
| genus = Stenocercus
| species = trachycephalus
| authority = (Duméril, 1851)
}}Stenocercus trachycephalus'', Duméril's whorltail iguana, is a species of lizard of the Tropiduridae family. It is found in Colombia.

References

Stenocercus
Reptiles described in 1851
Reptiles of Colombia
Endemic fauna of Colombia
Taxa named by Auguste Duméril